Heinrich Dankelmann (2 August 1887 – 30 October 1947) was a Luftwaffe General who served as the third Military Commander for the Territory of the Military Commander in Serbia from 23rd of July to 20th of October 1941. During his tenure as commander he oversaw numerous war crimes against the population, most famously hanging of five prisoners at Terazije Square. He was sentenced to death and executed for war crimes in Yugoslavia in 1947.

References

1887 births
1947 deaths
Place of birth missing
Luftwaffe World War II generals
People from Warburg
People from the Province of Westphalia
Prussian Army personnel
Reichswehr personnel
Recipients of the Iron Cross (1914), 1st class
Executed military leaders
Executed people from North Rhine-Westphalia
Holocaust perpetrators in Yugoslavia
German people executed abroad
Nazis executed by Yugoslavia by hanging
German people convicted of war crimes
People extradited from Germany
Generals of Aviators
Luftwaffe personnel convicted of war crimes
Executed mass murderers
Military personnel from North Rhine-Westphalia